The Megan Mullally Show is an American talk show hosted by Megan Mullally that debuted in syndication on September 18, 2006, and was cancelled in January 2007 due to its low ratings. Early promotions for the program featured Mullally as herself and as her Will & Grace character, Karen Walker. The talk show also aired nationally on TBS and was distributed by NBCUniversal Television Distribution.

Promotional television advertisements featured Mullally standing in front of the title-card attempting to correct the voice-over announcer who throughout the commercial mispronounces her name as "Minnie Minnie Moo Moo" and "Monkey McMonkey" among other names.

The first episode featured actor Will Ferrell (who came out to the set wearing nothing but his briefs) and Jenny McCarthy.

Cancellation
On January 4, 2007, NBC Universal, the show's production company, announced that production would cease immediately, and the show aired its final episode six days later.
The show, along with Dr. Keith Ablow and The Greg Behrendt Show, were canceled within the first two months of 2007 for low ratings. These shows were three of the four syndicated talk shows to debut in 2006 (Rachael Ray's self-titled talk show was the other). However, unlike the other two canceled series, The Megan Mullally Show did not finish out the season (both Behrendt and Dr. Keith Ablow aired several weeks of new episodes following their cancellations, and continued in reruns until September 7, 2007). Fox News called it "a bit dull and ordinary, and at times seemed very forced" and said viewers were disappointed to find out that Megan is not anything like Karen in real life, a reference to Karen Walker, the character Mullally played on the television sitcom Will & Grace.

References

External links 
 
 
 TV Series Finale - details of cancellation

2006 American television series debuts
2007 American television series endings
2000s American television talk shows
English-language television shows
First-run syndicated television programs in the United States
Television series by Universal Television
Television shows written by the Molyneux sisters